Alyaksey Kazlow (born 11 July 1989) is a Belarusian professional footballer. He played for Belarus in all three of their games at the 2012 Summer Olympics.

In 2020 Kazlow was found guilty of being involved in a match-fixing schema in Belarusian football. He was sentenced to 2 years of prison.

References

External links

1989 births
Living people
Footballers from Minsk
Belarusian footballers
Association football midfielders
Olympic footballers of Belarus
Footballers at the 2012 Summer Olympics
FC Smena Minsk players
FC Minsk players
FC Torpedo-BelAZ Zhodino players
FC Belshina Bobruisk players
FC Dinamo Minsk players
FC Naftan Novopolotsk players
FC Orsha players